Gyula József Csortos (3 March 1883 – 1 August 1945) was a Hungarian film and stage actor. He appeared in 80 films between 1912 and 1944. He was born in Munkács and died in Budapest.

Selected filmography
 A Vörös Sámson (1917)
 A Senki fia (1917)
 A Kuruzsló (1917)
 Liliom (1919)
 Hyppolit, a lakáj (1931)
 Judgment of Lake Balaton (1933)
 A Night in Venice (1934)
 Cafe Moscow (1936)
 Black Diamonds (1938)
Number 111 (1938)
 Duel for Nothing (1940)
 The Relative of His Excellency (1941)
 Changing the Guard (1942)

External links

1883 births
1945 deaths
Hungarian male film actors
Hungarian male silent film actors
Male actors from Budapest
20th-century Hungarian male actors